Magnolia georgii is a species of flowering plant in the family Magnoliaceae. It is endemic to Colombia. It is known commonly as cucharo.

References

georgii
Endemic flora of Colombia
Endangered plants
Taxonomy articles created by Polbot